Jules Prével (1835 in Saint-Hilaire-du-Harcouët – 1889 in Paris) was a 19th-century French journalist and opera librettist.

For a while, he was responsible for the theatre column in Le Figaro.

He participated in the writing of the libretto of the opérette La Romance de la rose by Jacques Offenbach (1869) as well as that of Le grand Casimir by Charles Lecocq (1879), Les Mousquetaires au couvent by Louis Varney (1880) and L'Amour mouillé (1887). (see list on bnf site below).

External links 
 Jules Prével on Wikisource
 
 Jules Prével on IdRef
 Jules Prével on 

19th-century French journalists
French male journalists
French opera librettists
Writers from Normandy
People from Manche
1835 births
1889 deaths
19th-century French male writers